Route nationale 59b (RN 59b) is a secondary highway in Madagascar, running from the intersection of RN 6 at Diego Suarez to beach village of Ramena. It is located in Diana Region and has a length of 19 km.

See also
List of roads in Madagascar
Transport in Madagascar

References

Roads in Diana Region
Roads in Madagascar